HMS Spey (K246) was a  of the Royal Navy (RN) from 1942 to 1948, subsequently sold to the Egyptian Navy.

Construction
Spey was built to the RN's specifications as a Group I River-class frigate. She was laid down at Smiths Dock Co., South Bank-on-Tees on 19 July 1941 and launched on 18 December 1941. The ship was commissioned the following year and was the second ship in the Royal Navy to carry the name, after the River Spey in Scotland. She was adopted by the civil community of Letchworth in Hertfordhsire as part of Warship Week in 1942.

War service

Spey was initially assigned to Western Approaches Command for convoy defence duties. She saw extensive service on convoy escort missions. On 11 July 1942 she shared the credit for the sinking of U-136. In December 1942 she was deployed to the Mediterranean for convoy defence and support of the landings in Italy, code-named Operation Torch. She returned to duties in the Atlantic and undertook operations until May 1944, when she was due for refit.

Following refit she sailed for Ceylon and by the end of 1944 was deployed for convoy defence and support of operations in Burma. In January 1945 this included support for landings on the northern shore of Ramree Island. In July 1945 she was prepared to support the proposed landing operations in Malaya. On return to the UK she was laid up in reserve.

Post-war service
Spey was sold to the Egyptian Navy in November 1948. She was refitted by Willougby (Plymouth) Ltd and sailed for Egypt in April 1950. During her service with the Egyptian Navy she is reported as having been used as a submarine support ship before being scrapped.

References

Bibliography

External links
 Comprehensive details of the Atlantic convoys and their fates.
  HMS Spey at naval-history.net

1941 ships
River-class frigates of the Royal Navy
Naval ships of Egypt
Ships built on the River Tees